Cash is legally recognized money in such forms as banknotes and coins.

Cash also may refer to:

Currency
 Cash (currency), various Asian units
 Cash (Chinese coin), also called "方孔錢" (fāng kǒng qián)
 Chinese cash (currency), also called "文" (wén)
 Vietnamese cash (văn), a historical Vietnamese currency unit and a specific copper coin

Places 
In the United States
 Cash, Arkansas
 Cash, Georgia
 Cash, Kentucky
 Cash, Michigan
 Cash, South Carolina
 Cash, Texas

People

Given name 
 Cash Asmussen (born 1962), American thoroughbred horse racing jockey
 Cash Peters, British writer
 Amir "Cash" Esmailian, Iranian-Canadian music industry executive

Middle name
 James Cash Penney (1875–1971), American businessman

Surname 
 Cash (surname)
 Chri$ Ca$h (1982–2005), stage name of American wrestler Christopher Bauman

Arts, entertainment, and media

Films
 Cash (1933 film), a British film by Zoltan Korda
 Cash (2007 film), Bollywood film set in Cape Town, South Africa
 Cash (2008 film) (stylized as Ca$h), French film directed by Eric Besnard
 Cash (2010 film) (stylized as Ca$h), American thriller directed by Stephen Milburn Anderson
 Tango & Cash, an American film featuring the fictional character Gabriel Cash

Music 
 C.A.S.H. (album), a 2010 album by Cassidy
 "Cash", a song by Patti Smith from her 2004 album Trampin'
 "Cash", a song by Brockhampton from Saturation
 "Cash", a song by Lil Baby from Harder Than Ever
 Cash Cash, an American band

Other uses in arts, entertainment, and media
 Cash: The Autobiography, autobiography of Johnny Cash
 "Cash" (The Young Ones), episode of the British sitcom
 Composers and Authors Society of Hong Kong (or CASH)

Other uses 
 Cash (mass) (厘 lí), traditional Chinese unit of mass or weight
 Cash's, J.J Cash Ltd., English manufacturer of ribbons & al. woven products
 Cash-Landrum incident, 1980 UFO sighting in the United States
 Cashless society, one without cash transactions
  Combat Support Hospital (or CASH), a type of US-military field-hospital
 Cortical androgen-stimulating hormone
 MetaBank (Nasdaq: CASH), American bank headquartered in South Dakota
  Square Cash, mobile payment app

See also 

 Cache (disambiguation)
 
 

ja:キャッシュ